During the 1999–2000 English football season, Wigan Athletic F.C. competed in the Football League Second Division.

Season summary
On 1 June 1999, John Benson was appointed as Wigan's manager. As Wigan settled into their new home at the JJB Stadium, Benson's side went 26 league games undefeated, before losing at home to Oldham Athletic on 7 January 2000, Benson picking up 2 Manager of the Month awards in the process. Towards the end of the season Wigan lost their form and found themselves in the play-off final at Wembley against Gillingham. A few days prior to the game, Benson had announced he was stepping down but remained to lead his team out at Wembley and ultimately a 3–2 defeat after being 2–1 up with only 7 minutes of extra time remaining.

Transfers

In

Out

Final league table

Results
Wigan Athletic's score comes first

Legend

Football League Second Division

Second Division play-offs

FA Cup

League Cup

Football League Trophy

Squad

Left club during season

References

Wigan Athletic F.C. seasons
Wigan Athletic F.C.